Vesmír is a Czech science magazine that has been published  since  1871. As of 2012, it is produced by the Czech Academy of Sciences and published by Academia.

References

1871 establishments in Austria-Hungary
Czech Academy of Sciences
Science and technology magazines
Magazines published in Prague
Magazines established in 1871